"Here Is the News" is a 1981 song written by Jeff Lynne and performed by Electric Light Orchestra (ELO).

It is track ten on the album Time (1981) and was released as a double A-side along with "Ticket to the Moon" in January 1982, reaching number 24 in the UK charts. The song makes heavy use of synthesizers but also includes guitar, bass guitar, piano, and a drum kit. The song is in Strophic form, lasts 3 minutes 43 seconds and ends with a fade out. The song is about the news programmes of 2095 and voices from news reports can be heard in the background during the song.

The song acts as a "doom-laden news bulletin full of chattering voices and space-age electronic effects." ELO writer Barry Delve feels that it is appropriately paired with "Ticket to the Moon" on the single since both songs "share lyrical references and have a similar string arrangement." But Delve also feels that these two songs were not the most commercial songs on Time to be released as singles, especially since their lyrics can be "enigmatic" and mystifying" outside the context of the concept album.

The intro of 'Here is the News' is also used in the idents and channel branding of the VPRO, a Dutch broadcasting channel. The idents of the VPRO with 'Here is the News' have been used as leaders on television since 1981 (except 1985–1987), and are used since 2010 at the end of a program. The VPRO used to use the intro on the radio to inform listeners of Radio 3 (later NPO 3FM) that a program of the VPRO was about to start. The intro of the song was also used by Television Malta in the intro to their news program between 1988 and 1999; now it is used by Radio Aniol Beskidow as news jingle.

Chart positions

References

1982 singles
Electric Light Orchestra songs
Song recordings produced by Jeff Lynne
Songs written by Jeff Lynne
1981 songs
Jet Records singles